Ochraethes tulensis is a species of beetle in the Cerambycidae family. It was described by Bates in 1892.

References

Ochraethes
Beetles described in 1892